A low-floor tram is a tram that has no stairsteps between one or more entrances and part or all of the passenger cabin. The low-floor design improves the accessibility of the tram for the public, and also may provide larger windows and more airspace.

An accessible platform-level floor in a tram can be achieved either by using a high-floor vehicle serving high-platform tram stops, or with a true low-floor vehicle interfacing with curb level stops.

Currently both types are in use, depending on the station platform infrastructure in existing rail systems. Some systems may make use of former railway alignments where use of existing high platforms is desirable, while others, particularly new systems, may not have the space to site high-level stops in urban centres.

Low-floor tram configurations

Trams traditionally had high floors, and these designs evolved into the tram with a low-floor centre section. Examples of this design are Amsterdam 11g/12g-trams and the Kusttrams in Belgium.

The most common design of 100% low floor vehicles uses short carbody sections for the wheels and longer suspended sections. Examples of this are the Alstom Citadis and Combino. A similar, but somewhat older technique is one that has been developed by MAN. In 1990, it was the first 100% low floor tram. These trams are found in ten German cities (such as Bremen and Munich) and in the Swedish city Norrköping. In many other German cities there are trams with low floor between the outer bogies and single axle bogies under the centre section.

"Light rail" type vehicles frequently have a similar configuration but with a centre bogie designed to accommodate a low floor situated under a short centre section. A more radical approach has been adopted for the City Class LRV (Citytram), where the main low floor section is only 300 mm above the rail. The low floor runs right through the articulation of both the 29 m long and 38 m Super Citytram version. In both, the corridor through the articulation is wide enough for seated passengers and a wheelchair to pass through. The City Class has been designed to turn on 15 m radius curves and to climb 10% gradients.

In Austria, Porsche Design designed Ultra Low Floor (ULF) Trams can "kneel" at the curbside, reducing the height from the road to only 180 mm.

Some public transport companies have both low floor and high floor trams. They report that low floor trams have 15% higher maintenance costs for the rolling stock, and 20% higher maintenance costs for the infrastructure on average. Among the problems observed is that the missing bogies result in a higher level of wear and tear.

Many low floor trams have fixed bogies which increase track wear and tear, while decreasing the speed at which a tram can drive through a curve (usually 4–15 km/h in 20 m radius curve). The Škoda ForCity and the newest Alstom Citadis X04 try to counter the effect with low floor pivoting bogies while maintaining 100% low floor design. Prior to the new design, pivoting bogies could only be used under high floors, hence such trams could only be part low-floor, with high-floor sections over the pivoting bogies.

Historic examples

The idea of a low-floor tram dates back to the early 20th century when a number of trolley systems began experimenting with various "stepless" designs.  Perhaps the most notable is the Hedley-Doyle Stepless car introduced in 1912 for use on Broadway in Manhattan.  A number of other cities also purchased Hedley-Doyle Stepless trams after seeing their success in Manhattan.  Since these cars had a unique appearance compared to any other trams running at the time, they earned a number of nicknames, including hobble skirt cars, public welfare cars, and sow bellies.

Typical floor heights

To put things into perspective, here are some typical floor heights for public transport vehicles, old and new:
 Ultra Low Floor tram — 180 mm  (7 inches)
 Low-floor tram — 300 mm to 350 mm   (11.8 to 13.78 inches)
 High-floor tram — more than 600 mm (23.62 inches)
 Heavy rail rapid transit — 800 mm (31.5 inches) to 1200 mm (47.25 inches) 
 North American inter-city rail passenger cars — 1350 mm (51 inches)

List of low-floor trams by country manufactured and manufacturers

Belarus
Belkommunmash 
AKSM-743 - Third Generation tram on Minsk tramway
AKSM-843 - Fourth generation tram on Minsk tramway

Canada
Bombardier Transportation (are subtypes and more)

A32 Flexity Swift
Citytram
Cobra
CR4000 Flexity Swift 
GT8-100D/2S-M
ET 2010 Flexity Swift (Tram-train)
E-class Melbourne tram Flexity Swift
Flexity 2 
Flexity 2 (version for Blackpool)
Flexity Berlin (Incentro family)
Flexity Classic 
Flexity Freedom 
Flexity Link 
Flexity Outlook Eurotram
Flexity Outlook Cityrunner  
Flexity Outlook Olympic Line  
Flexity Outlook (version for Toronto)
GT8-100D/2S-M
HF6 Flexity Swift (not low-floor, but due to the high platform is wheelchair-accessible)
Incentro
Incentro AT6/5 (version for Nottingham)
K4000 Flexity Swift
K4500 Flexity Swift
K5000 Flexity Swift (not low-floor, but due to the high platform is wheelchair-accessible)
K5200 Flexity Swift (not low-floor, but due to the high platform is wheelchair-accessible)
M5000 Flexity Swift (not low-floor, but due to the high platform is wheelchair-accessible)
Traintram Flexity Swift
Type 1 LVR Flexity Swift
T2000 
Bombardier Variobahn

Croatia
CROTRAM

 TMK 2200 (NT 2200)
 TMK 2200 K
 TMK 2300

Czech Republic
ČKD Tatra 

K3R-N (reconstruction with low-floor middle section)
K3R-NT (reconstruction with low-floor middle section)
KT8D5N (with low-floor middle section)
KT8D5R.N1 (reconstruction with low-floor middle section)
KT8D5R.N2 (reconstruction with low-floor middle section)
KT8D5R.N2P (reconstruction with low-floor middle section)
KTNF6 (reconstruction with low-floor middle section)
KTNF8 (reconstruction with low-floor middle section)
RT6N1
RT6N2
RT6S
Satra III (reconstruction with low-floor middle section)

Aliance TW Team

Tatra T3R.PLF (nicknamed "wana" (Czech for 'bath') - newly built with low-floor middle section)
Tatra T3R.SLF ("wana")
VarioLF ("wana")
VarioLF plus ("wana")
VarioLF plus/o ("wana")
VarioLF2
VarioLF2 plus
VarioLF2/2 IN
VarioLF3
VarioLF3/2
EVO1
EVO2
VV60LF (tow tramcar)

Škoda Transportation

03T Astra/Anitra/Elektra                   
05T Vektra
06T Elektra
10T Elektra
13T Elektra
14T Elektra
15T ForCity Alfa
16T Elektra
19T Elektra
26T ForCity Classic
27T
28T ForCity Classic
29T ForCity Plus
30T ForCity Plus
Artic ForCity Smart
  
Inekon Trams

01 Trio
04 Superior
11 Pento
12 Trio

France
Alstom 

ATM Class 6000
Citadis 100
Citadis 202 (on Melbourne tramway locally designated C-class) 
Citadis 301
Citadis 301 CIS numbers: 71-801.
Citadis 302 (on Melbourne tramway locally designated C2-class) 
Citadis 401
Citadis 402  
Citadis 403
Citadis 502 
Citadis X-04 (204, 304, 404)
Citadis X-05 (205, 305, 405) 
Regio-Citadis 
Citadis Dualis
Citadis Compact
Citadis Spirit 
Tatra KTNF8 in Gera
Tramway Français Standard (TFS)-1 (low-floor added at a later date)
TFS-2
Translohr vehicles
TW 2000 (not low-floor, but due to the high platform is wheelchair-accessible)

Germany
Allgemeine Elektricitäts-Gesellschaft AG (AEG) 

ATAC Class 9000

Duewag 

 

Düwag-Vevey Be 4/6
Düwag-Vevey Be 4/8
GT6-70D/N
GT8-100C/2S
GT8-100D/2S-M
GT8N (reconstruction with low-floor middle section)
GT8Z (reconstruction with 73% low-floor)
GT10 NC-DU (reconstruction with low-floor middle section)
MGT6D
M8C (not low-floor, but due to the high platform is wheelchair-accessible) 
M8C-NF (reconstruction with low-floor middle section)
MGT6D
Moderus Beta MF 01, MF 13, MF 14 AC BD, MF 18 (reconstruction with low-floor middle section)
M97 (reconstruction with low-floor middle section) 
N8C (not low-floor, but due to the high platform is wheelchair-accessible) 
Stadtbahnwagen B (not low-floor, but due to the high platform is wheelchair-accessible)
Supertram
TW 6000 (not low-floor, but due to the high platform is wheelchair-accessible)
U2 (not low-floor, but due to the high platform is wheelchair-accessible)
U3 (not low-floor, but due to the high platform is wheelchair-accessible)
U4 (not low-floor, but due to the high platform is wheelchair-accessible)
6MGT
8MGT

MAN

N8C (not low-floor, but due to the high platform is wheelchair-accessible)
N8S-NF (reconstruction with low-floor middle section)

Siemens

Avenio (on Munich tramway locally designated class T1)
Combino (on Melbourne tramway locally designated D1-class and D2-class) 
Combino Plus (also known as Combino Supra or Combino MkII) 
GT6-70D/N
GT8-70D/N
GT8-100D/2S-M
N8C (not low-floor, but due to the high platform is wheelchair-accessible)
Supertram 
S70 
SD-160 in platform level version (not low-floor, but due to the high platform is wheelchair-accessible)
S200 (not low-floor, but due to the high platform is wheelchair-accessible)
SD-400 (not low-floor, but due to the high platform is wheelchair-accessible)
SD-460 (not low-floor, but due to the high platform is wheelchair-accessible)
Stadtbahnwagen B (not low-floor, but due to the high platform is wheelchair-accessible)
TW 2000 (not low-floor, but due to the high platform is wheelchair-accessible)
Ultra Low Floor (ULF) in Vienna
U2 (not low-floor, but due to the high platform is wheelchair-accessible)
U3 (not low-floor, but due to the high platform is wheelchair-accessible)
U4 (not low-floor, but due to the high platform is wheelchair-accessible)

Adtranz 

Eurotram (on Milan tramway locally designated as Class 7000) 
GTxN/M/S (on Munich tramway locally designated classes R2 and R3) 
GT6-70D/N
GT8-70D/N
GT8-100D/2S-M
N8C (not low-floor, but due to the high platform is wheelchair-accessible)
Variobahn 
Vossloh Kiepe
GTZ8-B Vamos (not low-floor, but due to the high platform is wheelchair-accessible)
N8C  (not low-floor, but due to the high platform is wheelchair-accessible)
Stadtbahnwagen B

Ireland
Alstom
Citadis 301
Citadis 401
Citadis 402
Citadis 502

Italy
AnsaldoBreda
  
ATM Class 5000
ATM Class 7100 (family Sirio)
ATM Class 7500 (family Sirio)
ATM Class 7600 (family Sirio)  
M32 trams on Gothenburg tramway (family Sirio)
TEB serie 001-014 on Bergamo–Albino light rail
SL95
T-68 (not low-floor, but due to the high platform is wheelchair-accessible)
T-68A (not low-floor, but due to the high platform is wheelchair-accessible)
T-69

Fiat Ferroviaria 

ATM Class 5000
ATM Class 6000
ATAC Class 9100
ATAC Class 9200

Società Costruzioni Industriali Milano (Socimi)
ATAC Class 9000
Eurotram (on Milan tramway locally designated as Class 7000)

Japan
Alna Sharyo

Little Dancer Type A
Little Dancer Type C
Little Dancer Type L
Little Dancer Type S
Little Dancer Type U
Little Dancer Type Ua
Little Dancer Type X

Kinki Sharyo
Green Mover Max
Green Mover LEX
Kinki Sharyo SLRV

Poland
Konstal

Konstal 112N
Konstal 114Na
Konstal 116N/116Na
Konstal NGd99
Konstal 116Nd

Modertrans

Moderus Beta MF 01, MF 13, MF 14 AC BD, MF 18 (reconstruction with low-floor middle section)
Moderus Beta MF 02 AC, MF 15 AC, MF 16 AC BD, MF 19 AC (reconstruction with low-floor middle section)

PESA
 
120N Tramicus 
120Na Swing 
121N Tramicus 
121Na Swing
122N Tramicus 
122Na Swing
128N Jazz 
128NG Jazz 
134N Jazz 
2010N Twist 
2012N Twist Step 
2014N Twist Krakowiak 
71-414 Twist Fokstrot
 
Protram 
 
Protram 205 WrAs
Protram 206 WrAs - In project phase
Protram 405N - one prototype produced in 2012 and is used since then in Kraków

Solaris Bus & Coach
Solaris Tramino

Romania
Astra Vagoane Călători

Astra Autentic

Astra Imperio

Astra Imperio Metropolitan
 
Imperio Civitas

URAC Bucharest
Bucur LF (65% low floor)

V3A-93-CH/CA-PPC 

(low-floor middle section)
V3A-93-PPC

 
(reconstruction with low-floor middle section)

Russian Federation
PTMZ (Petěrburgskij tramvajno-mechaničeskij zavod)

LVS-2005
LVS-2008
LVS-2009 (71-154) and 71-154М

UKVZ (Usť-Katavskij vagonstrojitělnyj zavod imeni Sergeje Mironoviče Kirova) 
KTM-23 (71-623) 
KTM-24 (71-624)  
KTM-25 (71-625) 
KTM-30 (71-630)
KTM-31 (71-631)

Tver Carriage Works

71-911 (City Star)
71-931 (Vityaz) and 71-931M (Vityaz-M)

Spain
Construcciones y Auxiliar de Ferrocarriles (CAF)

Urbos 1
Urbos 2
Urbos 3 - version Urbos 70
Urbos 3 - version Urbos 100
Urbos 3 - version Urbos AXL
Urbos 3 - version Urbos TT
Urbos 3 - version Urbos LRV

Vossloh España
British Rail Class 398 Citylink
British Rail Class 399 Citylink
NET 2012

Switzerland
ABB Group
GT8-100C/2S (not low-floor, but due to the high platform is wheelchair-accessible)
Tram 2000 Be 4/8 (low-floor middle section)
Variobahn

Stadler Rail

Tango (Model Bochum)
Tango (Model Basel)
Variobahn  (on Munich tramway locally designated class S)

Turkey
Durmazlar
Durmaray Panorama
Durmaray Silkworm

Bozankaya

Ukraine
Electrontrans
 
Electron T3L44 (experimental)
Electron T5L64 (experimental)
Electron T5B65
Tatra-Yug
K-1M6 (experimental)
K-1M8
K-1M

Other trams 
AKSM 843 (BKM 843)
Siemens S70Konstal 116NAvanto (aka. Siemens S70)
BKM 85300M
DL6WA, mark Dalianren (meaning "Dalian people") manufactured by Tram Factory of Dalian, in Dalian. 
Boston MBTA Type 8 Trolley
Brookville Liberty Modern Streetcar
Cegielski 118N "Puma" (>60% low floor) 
Tram_Power Trampower City Class, UK
Hedley-Doyle Stepless car (1912)
Imperio, used on the Arad, Romania tram network
RTE 2009
SEPTA PCC II (loading platform)
Transtech Oy Artic Trams
United Streetcar trams
Tram 2000 Be 4/6 (not low-floor, but due to the high platform is wheelchair-accessible)
GTZ8-B Vamos
HCP Puma
M31 on Gothenburg tramway  (reconstruction with low-floor middle section)
Fukui Railway F1000 (:ja福井鉄道F1000形電車)
Hiroden 1000 series (II) (:ja:広島電鉄1000形電車 (2代))
Hiroden 5100 series :ja:広島電鉄5100形電車) 
Kumamoto City Tram 0800 (:ja:熊本市交通局0800形電車)
Kumamoto City Tram 9700 series (:ja:熊本市交通局9700形電車)
Man'yosen MLRV 1000 (:ja:万葉線MLRV1000形電車)
Okayama Electric Tramway 9200 (:ja:岡山電気軌道9200形電車)
:ja:SWIMO
Toyama Chiho Railway 9000 series (:ja:富山地方鉄道9000形電車)
Toyama Light Rail TLR 0600 (:ja:富山ライトレールTLR0600形電車)
Newag Nevelo
NGT6DD-ER on Dresden tramway  
Serie 3800 de FGV on Valencia tramway/CCFL fleet series 501-510 on Lisbon tramway

See also 

 Accessibility
 Low-floor bus
 Railway platform height

References

External links
 Strassenbahn-Online

Passenger rail transport
Tram vehicles
1990s in rail transport